The 2023 Spanish general election will be held no later than Sunday, 10 December 2023, to elect the 15th Cortes Generales of the Kingdom of Spain. All 350 seats in the Congress of Deputies will be up for election, as well as 208 of 265 seats in the Senate.

The term of the Spanish government appointed following the November 2019 election—which comprised a coalition of the Spanish Socialist Workers' Party (PSOE) and Unidas Podemos, the first such government nationwide in Spain since the times of the Second Spanish Republic—was quickly overshadowed by the outbreak of the COVID-19 pandemic in March 2020 and its political and economical consequences, including the worst worldwide recession since the Great Depression resulting from the massive lockdowns enforced to reduce the spread of SARS-CoV-2, as well as the economic impact of the 2022 Russian invasion of Ukraine. To the right of the political spectrum, and struggling to consolidate their political space in competition with each other, are the conservative People's Party (PP)—which saw a leadership change following an internal push by Galician and Madrilenian presidents, Alberto Núñez Feijóo and Isabel Díaz Ayuso, to oust party leader Pablo Casado in February 2022—the far-right Vox, and the liberal Citizens (CS), whose support in opinion polling has collapsed since the 2019 elections.

Pedro Sánchez, the incumbent prime minister, has repeatedly asserted his will to terminate the legislature when it is due in 2023, following the Spanish presidency of the Council of the European Union, dispelling any rumours of an early election call, and setting a tentative election date for December 2023.

Overview

Electoral system
The Spanish Cortes Generales are envisaged as an imperfect bicameral system. The Congress of Deputies has greater legislative power than the Senate, having the ability to vote confidence in or withdraw it from a prime minister and to override Senate vetoes by an absolute majority of votes. Nonetheless, the Senate possesses a few exclusive (yet limited in number) functions—such as its role in constitutional amendment—which are not subject to the Congress' override. Voting for the Cortes Generales is on the basis of universal suffrage, which comprises all nationals over 18 years of age and in full enjoyment of their political rights. Amendments to the electoral law in 2022 abolished the "begged" or expat vote system, under which Spaniards abroad were required to apply for voting before being permitted to vote. The expat vote system was attributed responsibility for a major decrease in the turnout of Spaniards abroad during the years it had been in force.

For the Congress of Deputies, 348 seats are elected using the D'Hondt method and a closed list proportional representation, with an electoral threshold of three percent of valid votes—which includes blank ballots—being applied in each constituency. Seats are allocated to constituencies, corresponding to the provinces of Spain, with each being allocated an initial minimum of two seats and the remaining 248 being distributed in proportion to their populations. Ceuta and Melilla are allocated the two remaining seats, which are elected using plurality voting. The use of the D'Hondt method may result in a higher effective threshold, depending on the district magnitude.

As a result of the aforementioned allocation, each Congress multi-member constituency would be entitled the following seats (as of 1 January 2022):

For the Senate, 208 seats are elected using an open list partial block voting system, with electors voting for individual candidates instead of parties. In constituencies electing four seats, electors can vote for up to three candidates; in those with two or three seats, for up to two candidates; and for one candidate in single-member districts. Each of the 47 peninsular provinces is allocated four seats, whereas for insular provinces, such as the Balearic and Canary Islands, districts are the islands themselves, with the larger—Majorca, Gran Canaria and Tenerife—being allocated three seats each, and the smaller—Menorca, Ibiza–Formentera, Fuerteventura, La Gomera, El Hierro, Lanzarote and La Palma—one each. Ceuta and Melilla elect two seats each. Additionally, autonomous communities can appoint at least one senator each and are entitled to one additional senator per each million inhabitants.

Election date
The term of each chamber of the Cortes Generales—the Congress and the Senate—expires four years from the date of their previous election, unless they are dissolved earlier. The election decree shall be issued no later than the twenty-fifth day prior to the date of expiry of the Cortes in the event that the prime minister does not make use of his prerogative of early dissolution. The decree shall be published on the following day in the Official State Gazette (BOE), with election day taking place on the fifty-fourth day from publication. The previous election was held on 10 November 2019, which means that the legislature's term will expire on 10 November 2023. The election decree must be published in the BOE no later than 17 October 2023, with the election taking place on the fifty-fourth day from publication, setting the latest possible election date for the Cortes Generales on Sunday, 10 December 2023.

The prime minister has the prerogative to dissolve both chambers at any given time—either jointly or separately—and call a snap election, provided that no motion of no confidence is in process, no state of emergency is in force and that dissolution does not occur before one year has elapsed since the previous one. Additionally, both chambers are to be dissolved and a new election called if an investiture process fails to elect a prime minister within a two-month period from the first ballot. Barred this exception, there is no constitutional requirement for simultaneous elections for the Congress and the Senate. Still, as of  there has been no precedent of separate elections taking place under the 1978 Constitution.

Following his party's defeat in the Madrilenian regional election held on 4 May 2021, Prime Minister Pedro Sánchez commented that there were still "32 months to go" ahead of the next general election, which meant that the election date was implied to be tentatively scheduled for January 2024. This opened questions on the maximum timetable for holding a new general election, with legal interpretations up until that point considering that the Cortes Generales's expiry date was set four years from the previous election; however, an interpretation that considered that the four year timetable started counting from the chamber's first assembly or from the prime minister's investiture could push the election date into January or February 2024. On 2 August 2022, Sánchez himself dispelled any doubts on this issue by announcing that the election would be held in December 2023.

Parliamentary composition
The tables below show the composition of the parliamentary groups in both chambers at the present time.

Parties and candidates
The electoral law allows for parties and federations registered in the interior ministry, coalitions and groupings of electors to present lists of candidates. Parties and federations intending to form a coalition ahead of an election are required to inform the relevant Electoral Commission within ten days of the election call, whereas groupings of electors need to secure the signature of at least one percent of the electorate in the constituencies for which they seek election, disallowing electors from signing for more than one list of candidates. Concurrently, parties, federations or coalitions that have not obtained a mandate in either chamber of the Cortes at the preceding election are required to secure the signature of at least 0.1 percent of electors in the aforementioned constituencies. The electoral law provides for a special, simplified process for election re-runs, including a shortening of deadlines, the lifting of signature requirements if these had been already met for the immediately previous election and the possibility of maintaining lists and coalitions without needing to go through pre-election procedures again.

Below is a list of the main parties and electoral alliances which will likely contest the election:

Internal disputes emerged within the People's Party (PP) following Isabel Díaz Ayuso's landslide victory in the 2021 Madrilenian election, as the regional president came to be seen by a party sector as a better candidate than Pablo Casado to face off Pedro Sánchez in a general election. The conflict came to a head from September 2021 when both sides clashed for the control of the party's regional branch in the Community of Madrid, with Ayuso's possible rise to the presidency of the regional PP being seen by Casado's supporters as an immediate threat to his national leadership. Following several months of a leadership that was perceived as poor and erratic, coupled with an erosion of popular support in opinion polls and a disappointing result in the 2022 Castilian-Leonese regional election, the crisis entered a new stage on 16 February 2022 when some media revealed an alleged plot of the party's national leadership to investigate Ayuso's family in search of compromising material—more specifically, alleged influence peddling in the awarding of public contracts to Ayuso's brother. After several days of public infighting between both Casado and Ayuso, Galician president Alberto Núñez Feijóo was reported as having agreed with the latter and other party regional presidents to become the party's new leader and replace Casado, who was said to be willing to hold on until the PP congress scheduled for July. On 22 February, Casado's resignation was announced after he was abandoned by most of the party's leadership and public officers.

As a result of Pablo Iglesias's farewell from active politics in May 2021, Labour minister—and, from July 2021, second deputy prime minister—Yolanda Díaz, came to be widely regarder as Iglesias's presumptive successor as prime ministerial candidate in the next general election. Díaz expressed her will to shape a new electoral platform transcending political parties, as well as the Unidas Podemos brand, aiming to secure the support of ideologically-close forces such as En Comú Podem (ECP), Compromís and Más Madrid/Más País while giving a prevalent role to civil society. The platform saw an advance unity act during an event to be held on 13 November 2021, with the participation of a number of women representative of the various political spaces that could eventually join it: Díaz herself, Barcelona mayor Ada Colau (ECP), Valencian vice president Mónica Oltra (Compromís), Madrilenian opposition leader Mónica García (Más Madrid) and Ceutan councillor Fatima Hamed (from the Movement for Dignity and Citizenship, MDyC); the absence of Podemos members in the event, most notably of Equality and Social Rights ministers Irene Montero and Ione Belarra, was seen as evidence of the growing diminished role of Unidas Podemos within the platform. Díaz's-led left-wing alliance was also well-received by prime minister Pedro Sánchez, who saw it as important for the "progressive space" to be in "top shape" in order for his government to be able to maintain and expand its majority in the next election. While the term "Broad Front" has been frequently used in the media to refer to Díaz's platform, it has been commeted that Díaz herself has rejected the use of this name for its connections with similar brandings used by left-wing populist alliances in Latin America. On 18 May 2022, it was announced that Díaz's platform would go under the name "Sumar".

In September 2021, citizen collectives of the so-called "Empty Spain" ( or España Vaciada), a coined term to refer to Spain's rural and largely unpopulated interior provinces, agreed to look forward to formulas to contest the next elections in Spain, inspired by the success of the Teruel Existe candidacy (Spanish for "Teruel Exists") in the November 2019 general election. By November 2021, it was confirmed that over 160 collectives and associations from about 30 Spanish provinces had committed themselves to finalizing the electoral platform before January 2022. It then contested the 2022 Castilian-Leonese regional election, with mixed results: a success for the Soria-based Soria Now! (SY) platform but a disappointment elsewhere.

Opinion polls

Polling aggregations

Notes

References

Spain
General elections in Spain
2023 elections in Spain